Damien Garvey is an Australian actor and former musician known for his film and television roles.

Early life 

Garvey graduated from Padua College in 1982.

Career

Garvey had guest roles in several drama series in his early part of his acting career. Some of his early roles include shows like Medivac (his first role, in 1998), Water Rats (2000), Young Lions (2002), and in the children's drama Cybergirl (2001).

Garvey appeared on McLeod's Daughters, in a recurring role from 2001 until 2007. He then had a role in season one of Sea Patrol (2007).

In 2008 and 2009, he appeared on ABC1's drama East of Everything. In 2010, acting in Channel Nine's Underbelly: The Golden Mile, Garvey won an AACTA Award for Best Guest or Supporting Actor in a Television Drama (2010).

In 2011, he had a role as a bartender and former soldier Tom Boylan, in the American sci-fi series Terra Nova, filmed entirely on the Gold Coast in Queensland.

In 2012, he returned to Australia to take a recurring role in Rake and the Jack Irish TV films and TV series.

In 2015 Garvey appeared in two episodes of Ash vs Evil Dead. Since 2018, he has portrayed Detective Senior Sergeant Bryan Nichols in the TV series Harrow (filmed in his childhood city of Brisbane).

In 2021, Garvey appeared in the TV adaptation of Liane Moriarty’s ’Nine Perfect Strangers’.

Film

Garvey, although appearing mainly on television, has had a few roles in film, including Under the Radar, In Her Skin, Accidents Happen, Daybreakers, Beauty and the Beast, Bait 3D, Drive Hard and Bleeding Steel.

Music

In the late-1980s Garvey was the lead singer in Brisbane indie rock band Neighbourhood Unit, who released two singles on the Brisbane-based Bent Records label. He then became lead singer in the power-pop band 'The Tellers'. The Tellers released two albums, Flex and Limited Movement.
Garvey appeared in the music video of Powderfinger’s The Day You Come (1999).

Filmography

Film

Television

References

External links

 

Living people
AACTA Award winners
Australian male film actors
Year of birth missing (living people)
Australian male television actors
People educated at Padua College (Brisbane)
20th-century Australian male actors
21st-century Australian male actors